Herbert Lomas (17 January 1887 – 12 April 1961) was a British actor who appeared in more than forty films in a career lasting between 1931 and 1955. He was born in Burnley, Lancashire and made his first film appearance in an early sound version of Hobson's Choice (1931).

His stage roles include Ian Hay's The Frog (1936), Emlyn Williams' The Wind of Heaven (1945), J.B. Priestley's Summer Day's Dream (1949) and Wynyard Browne's The Holly and the Ivy (1950)

Partial filmography

 Hobson's Choice (1931) - Jim Heeler
 Many Waters (1931) - Everett
 Frail Women (1932) - The Solicitor
 The Missing Rembrandt (1932) - Manning (uncredited)
 The Sign of Four (1932) - Major Sholto
 When London Sleeps (1932) - Pollard
 The Other Mrs. Phipps (1932, Short) - Minor Role
 Perfect Understanding (1933) - Bradley - Nick's Counsel
 Daughters of Today (1933) - Lincoln
 The Pointing Finger (1933) - Doctor (uncredited)
 The Man from Toronto (1933) - Jake
 Java Head (1934) - Barzil Dunsack
 Lorna Doone (1934) - Sir Ensor Doone
 Fighting Stock (1935) - Murlow
 The Phantom Light (1935) - Claff Owen
 The Ghost Goes West (1935) - Fergus
 The Black Mask (1935) - Sir John McTavish
 Fame (1936) - Rumbold Wakefield
 Rembrandt (1936) - Gerrit van Rijn - Rembrandt's Father
 Fire Over England (1937) - Minor Role (uncredited)
 Knight Without Armour (1937) - Vladinoff
 South Riding (1938) - Castle
 Glorious Morning (1938, TV Movie)
 Over The Moon (1939) - Ladbrooke
 Q Planes (1939) - Mattie - Fisherman (uncredited)
 Ask a Policeman (1939) - Coastguard
 Jamaica Inn (1939) - Dowland - Sir Humphrey's Tenant
 The Lion Has Wings (1939) - Holveg
 Inquest (1939) - Thomas Knight, Coroner
 The Ghost Train (1941) - Saul Hodgkin
 South American George (1941) - Mr. Butters
 Penn of Pennsylvania (1942) - Cockle
 They Met in the Dark (1943) - Van Driver
 Welcome, Mr. Washington (1944) - Blacksmith (uncredited)
 I Know Where I'm Going! (1945) - Mr. Campbell
 The Man Within (1947) - Farmer
 Master of Bankdam (1947) - Tom France
 Bonnie Prince Charlie (1948) - Kinloch Moidart
 The Guinea Pig (1948) - Sir James Corfield
 The Magic Box (1951) - Warehouse Manager
 The Net (1953) - George Jackson

References

1887 births
1961 deaths
English male film actors
English male stage actors
English male television actors
People from Burnley
Male actors from Lancashire
20th-century English male actors